Jill Hutchison (born March 8, 1945) is an American retired women's basketball coach, having served as head coach for 28 seasons at Illinois State. Hutchison also served as the first president of the Women's Basketball Coaches Association. She was active in USA Basketball, serving as the head coach of the gold-medal winning team representing the USA at the World University Games in 1983. Hutchison was inducted into the Women's Basketball Hall of Fame in 2009.

Early years
Although the University of New Mexico (UNM) had a women's basketball team as early as 1898, formal intercollegiate play did not start until the 1974–75 season. Hutchison attended New Mexico, graduating in 1967, and played basketball for intramural teams during her time at the school. Occasionally, the teams would play at "sports days" at area schools in Arizona and Utah.

Illinois State
After graduating from UNM, Hutchison was admitted to the master's program at Illinois State University. Her master's thesis involved study of female basketball players to determine whether their hearts could play the a full court game. Her research concluded that they could. She went on to become the head coach of the women's basketball team in 1970, and she remained in that position for 28 years.

USA Basketball
Hutchison was named head coach of the team that went to the World University Games in 1983. The team had a record of 5–1, losing only to Romania in an early round. After losing to Romania, the USA team faced a highly regarded Yugoslavia. A win was needed to advance to the medal round. The USA narrowly prevailed, winning 86–85, with Carol Menken-Schaudt contributing 25 points. That set up a rematch with Romania for the gold medal. The Romanians started out strong, and held a 42–36 lead at halftime, but the USA team took the lead back and ended up with a 22-point margin 83–61, to clinch the gold medal. The leading scorer on the team with just under 14 points per game was Joyce Walker, who went on to play for the Harlem Globetrotters.

Awards and honors
 1984 – Illinois State Athletics Hall of Fame
 1985 – MVC Coach of the Year
 1988 – MVC Coach of the Year
 1992 – Carol Eckman Award
 1996 – MVC Coach of the Year
 2009 – Inducted into the Women's Basketball Hall of Fame

Head coaching record
Source

Publications

References

1945 births
Living people
Illinois State Redbirds women's basketball coaches
New Mexico Lobos women's basketball players
American women's basketball coaches